Hampton House may refer to:

Locations in the United States

 FitzSimons–Hampton House, Augusta, Georgia, listed on the NRHP in Richmond County, Georgia
 Cora Beck Hampton Schoolhouse and House, Decatur, Georgia, listed on the NRHP in DeKalb County, Georgia
 Dunnan–Hampton House, Paxton, Illinois, listed on the NRHP in Illinois
 Hampton House (Chicago), Illinois
 Hampton Hall (Franklin, Kentucky), listed on the NRHP in Kentucky
 Doerhoefer–Hampton House, Louisville, Kentucky, listed on the NRHP in Louisville's West End
 Jesse Hampton House, Winchester, Kentucky, listed on the NRHP in Clark County, Kentucky
 The Hampton Mansion, on the Hampton National Historic Site, Hampton, Maryland
Hampton Hall (Woodville, Mississippi), listed on the NRHP in Mississippi
C.C. Hampton Homestead, Harrisburg, Nebraska, listed on the NRHP in Nebraska
Hampton House (Arcadia, North Carolina), listed on the NRHP in North Carolina
Ellis–Hampton House, Pendleton, Oregon, listed on the NRHP in Umatilla County, Oregon
Wetherby–Hampton–Snyder–Wilson–Erdman Log House, Tredyffrin, Pennsylvania, listed on the NRHP in Pennsylvania
Caldwell–Hampton–Boylston House, Columbia, South Carolina, listed on the NRHP in South Carolina
Hampton–Preston House, Columbia, South Carolina, listed on the NRHP in South Carolina
Hampton Plantation, McClellanville, South Carolina, listed on the NRHP in South Carolina
E.L. Hampton House, Tracy City, Tennessee, listed on the NRHP in Grundy County, Tennessee

See also 
Hampton Hall (disambiguation)
Hampton Inn (disambiguation)

Architectural disambiguation pages